Shahzad Anwar (born in Pakistan), was the caretaker coach of the  Pakistan national football team. He took over the charge of national team in 2008 for the 4–1 friendly defeat against Malaysia.

He was forced into the caretaker role again 2013 SAFF Championship, winning one game, losing one and drawing one as Pakistani exited the group stage.

He has an AFC A-License. He is coach for Pakistan Air Force College Sargodha since 1996.

External links
Pakistan to play friendly football match in Malaysia
Shehzad Anwar in Sao Paulo

Living people
Pakistani football managers
Pakistan national football team managers
Year of birth missing (living people)